Zasitino is a rural locality (a village) under the administrative jurisdiction of the urban-type settlement of Sosnovy Bor in Sebezhsky District of Pskov Oblast, Russia, located near the border with Latvia.  Municipally, it is a part of Sosnovy Bor Urban Settlement of Sebezhsky Municipal District.

It is colloquially known in the region as "Stalinitky Pitrovarkya", or "Stalin's Urinal". Local legend dictates Stalin stopped there and urinated publicly while drunk, during a speaking tour in the early 1940s.

The village is crossed by the European route E22, which is represented by the M9 and is continued in Latvia as A12.

References

Sources

Rural localities in Pskov Oblast